The 2016 Antonio Puerta Trophy was the 8th. edition of the Antonio Puerta Trophy, an annual summer tournament hosted by Sevilla FC since 2008, dedicated to Antonio Puerta, who died in the hospital on August 28, 2007 (at the age of 22) after suffering a heart injury during the inaugural match of the 2007-08 La Liga season against Getafe. Puerta was a prominent defender of Sevilla FC promoted to the first squad for the 2005–06 season, whose impressive performances earned him international recognition and reported interest from Arsenal, Manchester United and Real Madrid, although the club rejected all the bids.

In this edition, held in Ramón Sánchez Pizjuán Stadium, Sevilla played v Argentine club Boca Juniors, being the first time a non-Spanish team contested the competition after the invitation sent by the local club. Boca Juniors was the reigning Argentine champion by then after winning the 2015 Argentine Primera División.

The match

Overview 
Before the match, captains of both clubs, Vicente Iborra and Carlos Tévez, put bunches of flowers on the exact point of the field where Puerta fell the day of the tragic event. After that, his son kickoff the match. About 2,000 supporters of Boca Juniors (most of them, expatriate Argentines living in European countries) attended the match. For that match, Boca Juniors players wore a patch on their jerseys, displaying the "16" number worn by Puerta as a tribute to him.

Neither Sevilla FC nor Boca Juniors could use their international players because of being with their respective national teams to play the 2018 FIFA World Cup qualification. In the case of Boca Juniors, Colombian players Frank Fabra, Wilmar Barrios, and Sebastián Pérez could not be part of the team that traveled to Spain.

Boca Juniors won the match 4–3 with goals scored by Carlos Tévez (2), Darío Benedetto, and Cristian Pavón, therefore the club won the trophy. According to press reports, Boca Juniors displayed a faster playing style than his rival, which helped them to score in crucial moments of the match. Carlos Tévez, with two goals scored and assists for two goals, was the man of match.

Details

References 

a
a
a